Senators in the 14th Parliament of Pakistan refers to the members of the Senate of Pakistan in the 14th Parliament of Pakistan. The Senate is the upper legislative chamber of the bicameral legislature of Pakistan, and together with the National Assembly makes up the Parliament of Pakistan.

The Senate of Pakistan consist of total 104 members. 23 elect by the members of each of the total four Provincial Assemblies of whom 14 elect on general seats, four on women seats, four on technocrats/ulema seats, while one elect on non-Muslim seat. From the FATA, eight senators elect by direct and free vote, while Islamabad sends 4 members to the Senate of whom two elect on general seats, while one each on women and technocrat.

The tenure of a Senator lasts for six years but elections are held within the duration of three years  – when one half of the members of the senate retire after completion of their tenure.

The Senate election in Pakistan occurred on 5 March 2015 to elect one-half of the Senate. The senators elected in 2015, together with those elected on 2012, will comprise the Senate's delegation in the 14th Parliament of Pakistan.

Raja Zafar ul Haq of PML-N elected as Leader of the House while Aitzaz Ahsan of PPP succeed Ishaq Dar as Leader of the Opposition. Raza Rabbani of PPP and Abdul Ghafoor Haideri of JUI-F elected as the legislature’s speaker and deputy speaker, respectively.

Members

Membership changes

See also
List of members of the 14th National Assembly of Pakistan

References

External links 
 Official website of the Senate of Pakistan

Senators of Pakistan
Pakistani senators (14th Parliament)